The 1998–99 Omani League was the 23rd edition of the top football league in Oman. Al-Nasr S.C.S.C. were the defending champions, having won the previous 1997–98 Omani League season. Dhofar S.C.S.C. emerged as the champions of the 1998–99 Omani League with a total of 34 points.

Teams
This season the league had 10 teams. Quriyat Club and Buraimi SC were relegated to the Second Division League after finishing in the relegation zone in the 1997–98 season. The two relegated teams were replaced Second Division League teams Al-Suwaiq Club and Fanja SC.

Stadia and locations

League table

Top level Omani football league seasons
1998–99 in Omani football
Oman